Guled Hussein Kassim is a Somali politician. He belongs to the Ogaden subclan of the Darod. He is the former Minister of Posts and Telecommunications  of Somalia, having been appointed to the position on 27 January 2015 by the now former Prime Minister Omar Abdirashid Ali Sharmarke.

Kassim is a son of late Hussein Abdulkadir Kassim, an influential former minister in the Revolutionary Government of Somalia. He, a duo-citizen of both Somalia and United States, was educated in America.

References

Living people
Government ministers of Somalia
Year of birth missing (living people)